Robert E. (Bob) Griswold (born January 1, 1935, Chicago, Illinois) is an American author, educator, composer and business leader, and a long-time leader in the field of human potential development. He is the founder of Effective Learning Systems, Inc. and has authored over one hundred self-help audio programs. He is best known for his audio series The Love Tapes and While-U-Drive and his book Attract Money and More.

Biography
Bob was born in Chicago on January 1, 1935.  He was the third son of parents William & Esther Griswold, both born in Burlington, Iowa.

He attended Smyser Elementary school 1940 - 1948, Steinmetz High School, 1948–1952, Wright Junior College 1952 - 1954, and graduated from the University of Illinois at Urbana-Champaign in 1957.

He married his wife Deirdre in 1963.  They have four children, Kimberly, Kevin, Robert and Jeffrey.

In 1972, he moved his family to Edina Minnesota Edina, Minnesota where he founded Effective Learning Systems, Inc. He claims to have personally taught over 50,000 people techniques for relaxation, memory, stress management, controlling habits, goal achievement and self-esteem through seminars conducted for corporations, government agencies, and the general public.

Griswold has presented many conferences and workshops at the University of Minnesota and other colleges featuring speakers such as Wayne Dyer, Joyce Brothers, and others. Many of these professionals have become members of Effective Learning Systems' board of advisors.

Griswold served as a consultant to the Science Museum of Minnesota as Vice-President of the Minnesota Futurists and was appointed by Gov. Arne Carlson to the Minnesota Early Childhood Care and Education Council.

Griswold wrote How To Attract Money (published by Hachette Book Group, formerly Warner Books, which deals with the relationship between self-esteem and financial success.

Ideas and teachings 
Bob Griswold pioneered techniques for using the concepts of self-esteem, positive thinking, and the power of love to live a better life. Among the strategies and techniques that Bob has developed, copyrighted, and/or incorporated in his teaching are: a unique approach to meditative success known as Productive Meditation, Guided Imagery, Success Statements, Mental Movie Visualization, 10 Minute Goal Setting, Whole-Brain Learning, and Music Affirmations, which are well-researched positive statements  arranged and blended with carefully selected up-beat music and are featured in his While-U-Drive series of audios.

Bob also served as a consultant to the Science Museum of Minnesota, and as Vice-President of the Minnesota Futurists and was appointed by Gov. Arne Carlson to the Minnesota Early Childhood Care and Education Council.

At the request of Warner Books, a division of Time/Warner, Bob wrote How to Attract Money, which deals with the relationship between self-esteem and financial success. It is based on one of his most popular self-help audio titles, and has been printed in seven languages.

He has recently updated and expanded that work with his new book Attract Money and More. He is quoted as saying "It is no exaggeration to say that this book could be worth thousands, if not millions, of dollars to you."

Bibliography
 Attract Money and More (Effective Learning Systems, Inc., 2009) 
 Deep Relaxation (Effective Learning Systems, Inc., 2009) 
 Achieve Your Ideal Weight...Auto-matically (Effective Learning Systems, Inc., 2009) 
 Develop a Super Memory...Auto-matically (Effective Learning Systems, Inc., 2009) 
 Super Strength Self-Esteem + Self-Image Programming (Effective Learning Systems, Inc., 2009)

References

External links 
 Official Website

1935 births
Living people
American health and wellness writers
American motivational speakers
American spiritual writers
New Thought writers
American publishers (people)
American motivational writers
American self-help writers
Popular psychology
Relationship education